"Money in the Bank" is a song written by Bob DiPiero, John Jarrard and Mark D. Sanders, and recorded by American country music artist John Anderson.  It was released in April 1993 as the lead single from his album Solid Ground.  It peaked at number one on the United States Billboard Hot Country Singles & Tracks chart, and number one on the Canadian RPM Country Tracks chart.  It is his last number one hit to date (in America).

Music video
The music video was directed by Jim Shea, and premiered in early 1993.

Chart positions
"Money in the Bank" debuted at number 61 on the U.S. Billboard Hot Country Singles & Tracks for the week of May 1, 1993.

Year-end charts

References

1993 singles
1993 songs
John Anderson (musician) songs
Songs written by Bob DiPiero
Songs written by John Jarrard
Songs written by Mark D. Sanders
Song recordings produced by James Stroud
BNA Records singles